Dóra Csabai (born 20 April 1989 in Budapest) is a Hungarian female water polo player. At the 2012 Summer Olympics, she competed for the Hungary women's national water polo team in the women's event. She competed again for Hungary at the 2016 Olympics. On both occasions, the Hungarian team finished in 4th place.

References

External links
 

Hungarian female water polo players
1989 births
Living people
Olympic water polo players of Hungary
Water polo players at the 2012 Summer Olympics
Water polo players at the 2016 Summer Olympics
Universiade medalists in water polo
Water polo players from Budapest
Universiade silver medalists for Hungary
Medalists at the 2009 Summer Universiade
Medalists at the 2013 Summer Universiade
21st-century Hungarian women